Martin Edward Bain (born c. 1968) is the CEO of FSDL, the organising company of Indian Super League. He has also served as the CEO of English club Sunderland A.F.C, Scottish club Rangers and Maccabi Tel Aviv.

Life and career
Bain modelled part-time and worked in a Glasgow city-centre bar before focusing on a career in marketing and public relations.

He worked for Scottish football club Rangers from 1996 and was appointed to the board of directors in September 2001. During this time, he undertook roles as Commercial Director and Director of Football Business. Bain was appointed chief executive by chairman Sir David Murray on 11 February 2005. On 15 July 2008, Bain was elected to the Scottish Premier League's board of directors for a second term.

On 6 May 2011, Rangers F.C. was sold by David Murray, the majority shareholder, to Craig Whyte. As part of an independent panel set up to represent 27,000 minority shareholders in the sales transaction, Bain refused to agree to the sale and was subsequently suspended by the new owner. Bain resigned in June 2011 and raised an action in the Court of Session in relation to a breach of his employment contract, but abandoned his damages claim in March 2012. Following the administrative crisis which engulfed Rangers subsequently, during an SFA tribunal in May 2012 it transpired that Bain presented diligence to Sir David Murray at the time of the sale that proved his stance at the time of the takeover to be the correct one.

Bain was appointed chief executive of Israeli club Maccabi Tel Aviv in September 2014. During his time in Israel, the club won the domestic treble in 2015 and qualified for the Champions League. Bain was also a director of the Israeli Premier League, helping negotiate its biggest ever broadcast deal.

In 2016, Bain joined Sunderland A.F.C., replacing Margaret Byrne. His contract was terminated by the club by mutual consent in May 2018, following the club's second relegation in two seasons. He is said to have made regular use of the cryo-chamber during his time at the club.

On 11 October 2019, Bain was appointed as CEO of Football Sports Development Ltd., organisers of the Indian Super League, the top-tier football league in India.

References

Living people
1960s births
Scottish chief executives
Rangers F.C. non-playing staff
Maccabi Tel Aviv F.C.
Scottish expatriate sportspeople in Israel
Year of birth missing (living people)
Place of birth missing (living people)
Sunderland A.F.C. directors and chairmen